This article details the 2011–12 UEFA Europa League play-off round.

All times are CEST (UTC+02:00).

Round and draw dates
All draws held at UEFA headquarters in Nyon, Switzerland.

Play-off round

Teams
Below are the 76 teams involved in the play-off round (including 26 teams entering at this stage, 35 winners from the third qualifying round and 15 losing teams from the Champions League third qualifying round). The 38 winners of the play-off round qualified for the group stage to join the 10 losing teams from the Champions League play-off round.

Notes
Note 48: Order of legs reversed after original draw.
Note 49: As a result of match-fixing allegations, Turkish club Fenerbahçe were removed from the 2011–12 UEFA Champions League and were replaced with Trabzonspor on 24 August 2011. As a result, Trabzonspor's second leg against Athletic Bilbao was cancelled, and Athletic Bilbao qualified for the group stage.
Note 50: Celtic lodged protests over the eligibility of a number of the Sion players who participated in the two legs of the play-off round, which Sion won 3–1 aggregate (first leg: 0–0; second leg: 3–1). The UEFA Control and Disciplinary Body accepted the protests and decided to award both matches to Celtic by forfeit (3–0). As a consequence, Celtic are qualified for the UEFA Europa League group stage.

First leg

Notes
Note 51: Vaslui played their home match at Stadionul Ceahlăul, Piatra Neamţ as their own Stadionul Municipal did not meet UEFA criteria.
Note 52: Zestafoni played their home match on Boris Paichadze National Stadium, Tbilisi as it has a greater capacity than their own David Abashidze Stadium.
Note 53: Steaua București played their home match at Stadionul Dr. Constantin Rădulescu, Cluj-Napoca as they have left their own Stadionul Steaua prior to the season.
Note 54: Differdange 03 played their home match at Stade Josy Barthel, Luxembourg City as their own Stade du Thillenberg did not meet the UEFA criteria.

Second leg

Vorskla Poltava won 5–3 on aggregate.

Legia Warsaw won 5–4 on aggregate.

Rennes won 6–1 on aggregate.

PSV Eindhoven won 5–0 on aggregate.

Beşiktaş won 3–2 on aggregate.

AEK Larnaca won 2–1 on aggregate.

Lokomotiv Moscow won 3–1 on aggregate.

Dynamo Kyiv won 3–1 on aggregate.

Austria Wien won 3–2 on aggregate.

AEK Athens won 2–1 on aggregate.

Hapoel Tel Aviv won 4–1 on aggregate.

Steaua București won 3–1 on aggregate.

2–2 on aggregate. Braga won on away goals.

Rapid București won 4–2 on aggregate.

Vaslui won 2–1 on aggregate.

Maccabi Tel Aviv won 4–2 on aggregate.

Standard Liège won 4–1 on aggregate.

Schalke 04 won 6–3 on aggregate.

Atlético Madrid won 6–0 on aggregate.

Shamrock Rovers won 3–2 on aggregate.

Anderlecht won 4–3 on aggregate.

Athletic Bilbao qualified for the group stage after Trabzonspor replaced Fenerbahçe in the Champions League.

Maribor won 3–2 on aggregate.

Fulham won 3–1 on aggregate.

Celtic was awarded the tie (6–0 on aggregate) due to ineligibility of Sion players.

Club Brugge won 5–3 on aggregate.

Metalist Kharkiv won 4–0 on aggregate.

Slovan Bratislava won 2–1 on aggregate.

Lazio won 9–1 on aggregate.

Birmingham City won 3–0 on aggregate.

Stoke City won 5–1 on aggregate.

AZ won 7–2 on aggregate.

Paris Saint-Germain won 6–0 on aggregate.

PAOK won 3–1 on aggregate.

Tottenham Hotspur won 5–0 on aggregate.

2–2 on aggregate. Red Bull Salzburg won on away goals.

Hannover 96 won 3–2 on aggregate.

Sporting CP won 2–1 on aggregate.

Notes
Note 55: Gaz Metan Mediaș played their home match at Stadionul Dr. Constantin Rădulescu, Cluj-Napoca as their own Stadionul Gaz Metan did not meet the UEFA criteria.
Note 56: CSKA Sofia played their home match at Vasil Levski National Stadium, Sofia as their own Balgarska Armiya Stadium did not meet the UEFA criteria.
Note 57: Rapid București played their home match at Stadionul Dan Păltinişanu, Timișoara as they have left their own Stadionul Giuleşti-Valentin Stănescu prior to the season.
Note 58: Trabzonspor were due to play their home match at Türk Telekom Arena, Istanbul as their own Hüseyin Avni Aker Stadium needed maintenance work after the 2011 European Youth Summer Olympic Festival.

References

External links
2011–12 UEFA Europa League, UEFA.com

Qualifying rounds
UEFA Europa League qualifying rounds